Gian Carlo Aliberti, also Giancarlo or Giovanni Carlo Aliberti, (13 February 1670 - 2 February 1727) was a prolific Piedmontese painter of the seventeenth and eighteenth centuries.

Biography
He was born in Canelli in 1670 (according to some sources on 5 March 1662). He soon moved to Asti. His artistic training is not known. According to Lanzi he made his own manner of painting, that is, he resented the Maratta and the Carracci school, with some echoes from Correggio. His activity, very fervent, however, took place within his region. He trained likely with Giovanni Battista Fariano in Asti. By the turn of the century, he moved to Rome, to pursue further training. Returning to Asti, he wed the daughter of the painter Giovanni Antonio Laveglia. In Canelli, there are two canvases, Death of St Joseph and an Immaculate Conception located in the parish church of San Tommaso. Other paintings in the city include a Pentecost, an Epiphany, a St Roch among the pestilent and a St George.

Many of his frescoes, painted in the Rococo manner, have been lost along with the churches for which they were made. Two from Sant’Anastasio, Asti (demolished in 1907) are conserved in the town's civic art gallery in Palazzo Mazzetti: Tobias and the Angel, and Healing of the Paralyzed. The Gallery also exhibits St Anne between St Carlo Borromeo and Ste Cristina. The Miracle of Saint Clare is depicted at the church of Santa Chiara in Cuneo.

His works are also found in Santa Caterina, Casale Monferrato; San Martino, La Morra; and Sant'Agostino, Cherasco.

He died in Asti in 1740.

He had two sons: Carlo Filippo, born in Asti, who died after 1776, civil architect and theater designer, and Giuseppe Amedeo, known as Abate Aliberti, born in Asti around 1710, who died in 1772, a painter, also known by the name of Gian Giacomo.

Notes

Further reading
 Entry for Gian Carlo Aliberti in Preface for an edition of Giorgio Vasari, Vite de’ più eccellenti pittori scultori e architetti, rev. by Guglielmo della Valle, 11 vols (Siena: Pazzani Carli, 1791–94) XI (1794), p. 36.

1662 births
1740 deaths
People from Canelli
17th-century Italian painters
Italian male painters
18th-century Italian painters
Painters from Piedmont
Italian Baroque painters
18th-century Italian male artists